Georgios Mylonas (Greek: Γεώργιος Αλεξάνδρου Μυλωνάς; 6 April 1919 – 14 February 1998) was a Greek Center Union politician and government minister.  He was a close aide to Greek statesman and premier Georgios Papandreou, and was repeatedly elected deputy for the Ioannina seat with the Center Union. Mylonas had served as an undersecretary to the premier's office and education undersecretary from 1963 to 1965. He assumed the transport ministry in the first post-junta government in 1974 and was Minister for Culture from 1989 to 1990. Mylonas was the author of the book Escape From Amorgos, detailing his escape from the island, where he was exiled during the 1967-1974 military dictatorship. The escape was organized by his then, son-in-law Elias B.M. Kulukundis and his daughter Eleni Mylonas with the help of Maria Becket.

Books 
 George Mylonas (1974). Escape From Amorgos: The Story of a Greek Political Prisoner's Struggle for Freedom. Scribners. 
Απόδραση από την Αμοργό, Γιώργος Μυλωνάς, Ποταμός, 2015, 
Elias B.M. Kulukundis (2013). The Amorgos Conspiracy.

Documentary 
 Stelios Kouloglou, Escape From Amorgos, 1984 Productions AE-Tvxs.gr, 2015

Press 
 Nicholas Gage (21 September 1969). "The Prisoner of Amorgos". The New York Times.
Thomas J. Hamilton (11 October 1969). "Greek Who Fled Hopes to Mobilize All Shades of Opinion Against Military Regime". The New York Times.
"Greece: The L.B.J. Caper", Time. 17 October 1969.
"International, Greece: One Man's Odyssey". Newsweek. 20 October 1969.
Hendrik Hertzberg (10 April 1970). "Democrat". The New Yorker.  
Nicholas Gage & Ilias Kulukundis (1970). "Report From Greece - Under the Junta". The American Scholar.

References 

1919 births
1998 deaths
Centre Union politicians
Greek expatriates in France